The Right Brothers were an American conservative band, consisting of Aaron Sain and Frank Highland of Nashville, Tennessee. They received international attention in 2006 for their song "Bush Was Right", which expressed support for President George W. Bush and the Iraq War. The song received international press coverage, including in the United States, Britain, Poland, Switzerland, Argentina, and Denmark.

Career
In January 2004, RightMarch.com posted their first song, the country-flavored "Hey Hollywood," on their website, and in 72 hours it received 15,000 downloads. Within a few weeks the number was over 35,000. Later, a new song and video surfaced, the anti-abortion and pro-adoption "I Want To Live"  and received over 1 million views.

Their song "Bush Was Right" was a topic on cable news, such as MSNBC's Countdown with Keith Olbermann.

Before releasing their latest CD, The Right Brothers compiled a special 10-song disc to honor American troops. In 2006, the band opened for Sean Hannity at a rally for Georgia Lieutenant Governor candidate Ralph Reed.

The Right Brothers have appeared on various venues, such as The Michael Medved Show, Maxim Radio, The Hugh Hewitt Show, The Lars Larson Show, C-SPAN, Sound-off Connecticut with Jim Vicevich, The Kirby Wilbur Show in Seattle, Washington, The Liddy & Hill Show in Phoenix, Arizona, The Martha Zoller Show, RightMarch Radio, Take a Stand with Adam McManus, and others. Their music also has been heard on The G. Gordon Liddy Show, as well as National Public Radio.

As of 2011, the Right Brothers were no longer producing music.

Discography
For My Country (June 2004)
II (February 2005)
Remember: A Military Appreciation Project (June 2006)
No Apologies (December 5, 2006)

Singles
Hey Hollywood (January 2004)
I Want to Live
Bush Was Right (October 2005)
Dear Rosie (June 3, 2007)
One Life (January 4, 2006)

Videos
Bush Was Right (2006)
I Want To Live
Half of Her Heart (February 19, 2007)

References

External links
The Right Brothers homepage (captured by the Wayback Machine)

Conservative media in the United States
Musical groups from Nashville, Tennessee
Political music groups